Mount Cook is an inner suburb of the metropolitan area of Wellington, The North Island, New Zealand, 1.74 km dead south of Wellington's Central Business District. Its local constituency area is the Wellington Central, and is part of the City of Wellington local government area. The suburb stands on the southern fringe of the central city alongside Te Aro and to the north of Newtown.

History

After being settled by Maori since roughly 1000 CE, the Mount Cook area was situated on a fertile hill, just south of Te Aro Pā. The hill was the origin-point of the original survey marks through Wellington. It was given its current name by the New Zealand Company, after Captain James Cook (the mountain in the South Island was named separately), and was the suite of a large British military base, and later a prison that was "loathed by Wellingtonians", and demolished in 1931.

During the Victorian and Edwardian eras, Mt Cook became a favoured suburb of Wellington's elite, and many palatial mansions, such as the timber houses known as "painted ladies", were constructed along the Kent and Edward Terrace rivers; After the Earthquake of 1855, many were built around what was now the Basin Reserve. Densely populated mid-to-postwar Wellington had all eyes on Mount Cook, where the Dominion Museum and the carillon opened for the country's 100th anniversary of the Treaty of Waitangi, in 1940. Over the span of its history, Mount Cook has become known for its culture of bohemianism and preservation of uniquely Wellingtonian Victorian Architecture. Mount Cook's attractions and institutions include the Colonial Cottage Museum, the Wellington campus of Massey University and the National War Memorial, and, to cricketers locally and around the world, the Basin Reserve.

Demographics

Mount Cook had a population of 6,858 at the 2018 New Zealand census, an increase of 255 people (3.9%) since the 2013 census, and an increase of 345 people (5.3%) since the 2006 census. There were 2,529 households. There were 3,363 males and 3,498 females, giving a sex ratio of 0.96 males per female, with 360 people (5.2%) aged under 15 years, 3,864 (56.3%) aged 15 to 29, 2,295 (33.5%) aged 30 to 64, and 336 (4.9%) aged 65 or older.

Ethnicities were 73.2% European/Pākehā, 10.3% Māori, 4.1% Pacific peoples, 17.6% Asian, and 5.9% other ethnicities (totals add to more than 100% since people could identify with multiple ethnicities).

The proportion of people born overseas was 36.6%, compared with 27.1% nationally.

Although some people objected to giving their religion, 63.7% had no religion, 20.6% were Christian, 3.2% were Hindu, 1.7% were Muslim, 1.9% were Buddhist and 4.0% had other religions.

Of those at least 15 years old, 2,595 (39.9%) people had a bachelor or higher degree, and 321 (4.9%) people had no formal qualifications. The employment status of those at least 15 was that 3,366 (51.8%) people were employed full-time, 1,188 (18.3%) were part-time, and 513 (7.9%) were unemployed.

Education
 Wellington High School and Community Education Centre is a state co-educational secondary (years 9–15) school.
 Mount Cook School is a state co-educational full (years 1–8) primary school.
 Massey University's Wellington campus

References

External links
 Mount Cook school website

Suburbs of Wellington City